Ashna Zaveri is an Indian actress in Tamil films.

Career 
Ashna made her film debut with Vallavanukku Pullum Aayudham (2014), which was a success. Regarding her performance, a critic stated that "Ashna Zaveri does not have much to do in the film, but she looks pretty as a picture and delivers a decent performance". She starred with Santhanam again in Inimey Ippadithan the following year. For  her role in Inimey Ippadithan, Zaveri practiced Tamil to master the language.

Filmography

References

External links
 

Indian film actresses
21st-century Indian actresses
Actresses in Tamil cinema
Living people
Year of birth missing (living people)
Place of birth missing (living people)